Nayjuk (also Romanized as Nāyjūk and Nayjook; also known as Nahīn and Nājiūk) is a village in Dowlatabad Rural District, in the Central District of Abhar County, Zanjan Province, Iran. At the 2006 census, its population was 333, in 89 families.

References 

Populated places in Abhar County